The Integrated School of Ocean Sciences is a platform for postgraduate education that serves the multi- and transdisciplinary research community in ocean sciences in Kiel, Germany. It is part of the Cluster of Excellence "The Future Ocean" at Kiel University.

General 
More than 160 doctoral candidates and 160 supervisors take part in the programme (data from August 2017) and are supported alike through ISOS. Doctoral candidates access a community from all the natural science disciplines, law, economics, ethics, art and more. They are challenged to see their research in a wider context that includes complex problem-framing in a multidisciplinary environment. Research-based education involves partners from academia, industry, politics, NGOs, which allows a flexible, need-based programme; an active alumni network provides further input into the programme. In addition, doctoral candidates can apply for financial support for conferences and for so-called 'Miniproposals', i.e. small own projects.

References 

Postgraduate schools in Germany
Oceanographic organizations
University of Kiel